Minyichthys myersi, also known as Myer's pipefish, is a species of marine fish belonging to the family Syngnathidae. They can be found inhabiting coral in many areas of the Indo-Pacific including Mauritius, Indonesia, the Philippines, Papua New Guinea, and French Polynesia. Their diet likely consists of small crustaceans such as copepods and amphipods. Reproduction occurs through ovoviviparity in which the males brood eggs before giving live birth.

Etymology
The fish is named in honor of George S. Myers (1905-1985), from Stanford University.

References

External links 

 Minyichthys myersi at FishBase

Syngnathidae
Taxa named by Earl Stannard Herald
Taxa named by John Ernest Randall
Fish described in 1972